Rhagio strigosus is a Palearctic species of  snipe fly in the family Rhagionidae.

References

External links
Images representing Rhagio

Rhagionidae
Insects described in 1804